Génicourt-sur-Meuse (literally Génicourt on Meuse) is a commune in the Meuse department in Grand Est in north-eastern France.

See also
Communes of the Meuse department
Parc naturel régional de Lorraine

References

Genicourtsurmeuse